Gerry Brown (born November 9, 1951) is an American jazz drummer.

Life
Brown was born in Philadelphia, Pennsylvania, United States. He began playing the drums at the age of five. He played with soul groups and played in high school with bassist John Lee, with whom he attended music academy in 1970. In 1971, he moved to New York, where he played for Lionel Hampton. In 1972 he moved to the Netherlands with Lee to join Chris Hinze's rock jazz group. With bassist John Lee as co-leader, he recorded a series of albums in the 1970s. Alongside Lee, he also worked for Jasper van 't Hof, Charlie Mariano, Eef Albers and Gary Bartz in the mid-1970s. Subsequently, they were members of Larry Coryell's The Eleventh House for two years; Brown also played for Stanley Clarke and Chick Corea. In 1979, he accompanied Didier Lockwood at the Montreux Jazz Festival.

In 1986, he succeeded Billy Cobham in Consortium. For 14 years, he performed with Stevie Wonder (1992-2004). Since 2000, he has been the drummer for Diana Ross.

With bassist Nathan Watts, he recorded the instructional video R&B Drumming - Featuring Gerry Brown and his Motown Sound.

Discography
 Infinite Jones (with John Lee, Chris Hinze, Gary Bartz) (Keytone, 1973; reissued on CD as Bamboo Madness)
 Mango Sunrise (with John Lee) (Blue Note, 1975)
 Still Can't Say Enough (with John Lee) (Blue Note, 1976) 
 Medusa (with John Lee) (Columbia, 1977)
 Chaser (with John Lee) (Columbia, 1979)

References

Bibliography
 Martin Kunzler. Jazz-Lexikon. Vol. 1: A–L (= rororo-Sachbuch. Bd. 16512). 2nd edition. Rowohlt (Reinbek bei Hamburg, 2004). .

1951 births
Living people
American jazz drummers
Jazz fusion musicians